Pygmy kingfisher may refer to:

Subfamily
River kingfisher, the subfamily  Alcedininae

Species
 African pygmy kingfisher, Ispidina picta
 American pygmy kingfisher, Chloroceryle aenea
Madagascar pygmy kingfisher, Corythornis madagascariensis